Greebo Games is a miniature figures manufacturing company founded by former professional goldsmith; Lorenzo Giusti in 2007, and currently headquartered in Poggio a Caiano, near Prato, Italy. Their product line includes, but is not limited to, miniatures to be used in Fantasy Football games (such as Blood Bowl, Deathball, and Street Bowl) and other roleplaying or wargaming game systems, both pre-existing and created entirely in-house. Their track record includes multiple collaborations with Lucca Comics & Games, the 2015 NAF Bood Bowl World Cup in Lucca and multiple successfully completed Kickstarter projects, such as the Obsidian Dusk Elves, Alastoran Chaotic teams and Primal Scales teams for Fantasy Football game systems.

History 

The company was founded in 2007 by a group of professional sculptors and metalsmiths, and struck commercial success with Tutatis, its first game system created entirely in-house (with Fabio Bottoni as external contributor for part of the ruleset): the game was sold out in the years 2010, 2011 and 2012, and was subsequently reprinted.

Beginning in 2011, Greebo Games began producing its first models for Fantasy Football game systems and releasing them through platforms such as IndieGogo: examples include the Nippo Goblins and Turtles (2012), Waag Saabi goblins (2013), Snø vikings (2013) and Hand of Death ratmen (2014), which established the company's status as one of a notable Italian producers of miniatures for Fantasy Football tabletop games.

In 2013, the company's sculptors held a sculpting class during the Lucca Comics & Games convention: the collaboration went on through 2015, when Greebo Games participated in the second edition of the fair's Sculpting Rush project. During the same year, the company supported the candidacy of Lucca as host city of the 2015 edition of the Blood Bowl NAF World Cup tournament: Lucca won the bid, and subsequently welcomed more than 1000 players from all over the world. To celebrate the occasion, Greebo Games created and produced the limited edition miniatures that compose the Un-Renaissance Undead team, in order to hand them out to all attendees. The team was subsequently made available to the general public through Kickstarter in January 2016, with multiple models added in order to meet demand: the crowdfunding project was successfully funded, completed and carried out by May 2016. In 2014, Greebo Games also launched the dungeon crawler boardgame Dungeon Storming (with the rule set created by Serpentarium) and, in 2015, multiple expansion sets, to positive reviews. In 2018, Greebo Games also sculpted the miniatures that were ultimately included in the KickStarter project Village Attacks, a co-op boardgame produced by Grimlord Games.

Company Product Range 
Greebo Games products include about 20 different teams for Fantasy Football tabletop games and over 1.200 individual models, both in resin and metal. It also produces Greebonite Ink, a black primer ink that can be used to quickly highlight the details on single sculpts in order to give "out-of-the-box" models a more aesthetically pleasing look on the tabletop.

Limited Edition Products 
In April 2017, Greebo Games created its Legacy Vault, a section of its website dedicated to limited edition miniatures and busts released for major festivities, such as Halloween, Christmas, Valentine's Day or Easter: the models are generally shown to the general public with a Kickstarter campaign, and subsequently not made anymore beyond their first production run. Additionally, all models belonging to this section are sold with a numbered Certificate of Authenticity.

Notable Kickstarter Projects 
 Un-Renaissance (2016) - backed by 528 people, for a total of 51.814 Euros;
 Florence Knights (2017) - backed by 614 people, for a total of 73.054 Euros
 Obsidian Dusk (2017) - backed by 1.065 people, for a total of 119.318 Euros.
Alastoran (2018) - backed by 1.273 people, for a total of 177.156 Euros.
Cutiemals: Northern Clans (2019) - backed by 743 people, for a total of 74.516 Euros.
Primal Scales (2019) - backed by 1.187 people, for a total of 140.940 Euros.
Necromals: Eternal Lethargy (2020) - backed by 440 people, for a total of 41.833 Euros.
Vicious Wildfire (2020) - backed by 897 people, for a total of 89.526 Euros.

References

External links 
 Official Greebo Games Website

Miniature figures